Yunta is a town and locality in the Australian state of South Australia located in the state's east about  north-east of the state capital of Adelaide. It is a service centre supporting both the local area and travellers passing through on the Barrier Highway. It lies south west of Broken Hill and north east of Peterborough.

History
Yanta was an early spelling. In 1866 the district was known as part of the Tattawappa and Yanta Run. Yunta township was established in 1887 after the discovery of gold at the nearby diggings at Teetulpa and Waukaringa, when more than 5,000 miners made their way through here. In the early 1890s the village was a busy railway town on the Adelaide to Broken Hill line. From 1934 Yunta was the base for the famed outback trucking and mail contractor Harry Ding.

Today Yunta is a small service centre for travellers and the surrounding properties. Yunta also provides an alternate route to the Flinders Ranges and beyond. The natural gas fields at Gidgealpa and Moomba have resulted in improved access roads to South Australia's arid north-east region.

Commercial area 

Village facilities include a hotel offering meals and accommodation, two roadhouses (one with caravan sites), two fuel stations, post office, Rural Transaction Centre offering internet access, police station, air strip and a primary school. Opposite the hotel there is a rest area with public toilets which can be used for free (donation) overnight stays.

There was once a RV waste dump located between the railway line and the highway at the western end of town. Recently a commercial potable water dispensing system has been installed nearby. The main annual event is the Yunta Picnic Races and gymkhana held in May.

Politics
Yunta is located within the federal division of Grey, the state electoral district of Stuart and the Pastoral Unincorporated Area of South Australia. As of 2018, the community within Yunta received municipal services from a South Australian government agency, the Outback Communities Authority.

References
Notes

Citations

External links

Towns in South Australia
Far North (South Australia)
Places in the unincorporated areas of South Australia